The 2004 UEFA European Football Championship, commonly referred to as Euro 2004, was the 12th edition of the UEFA European Championship, a quadrennial football competition contested by the men's national teams of UEFA member associations. The final tournament was hosted for the first time in Portugal, from 12 June to 4 July 2004. A total of 31 matches were played in ten venues across eight cities – Aveiro, Braga, Coimbra, Guimarães, Faro/Loulé, Leiria, Lisbon, and Porto.

As in 1996 and 2000, the final tournament was contested by 16 teams: the hosts plus the 15 teams that came through the qualifying tournament, which began in September 2002. Latvia secured their first participation in a major tournament after overcoming Turkey in the play-offs, while Greece returned to the European Championship after 24 years.

The tournament was rich in surprises and upsets: Traditional powerhouses Germany, Spain, and Italy were eliminated in the group stage, while defending champions France were knocked out in the quarter-finals by Greece. Portugal recovered from an opening defeat against Greece to reach the final, eliminating England and the Netherlands along the way. For the first time in a major European football tournament, the last match featured the same teams as the opening match. Portugal were again defeated by Greece with a goal from Angelos Charisteas. Greece's triumph was unexpected, considering that they had only qualified for two other major tournaments, the UEFA Euro 1980 and the 1994 FIFA World Cup, where they failed to win a single match. As winners, Greece earned the right to represent Europe at the 2005 FIFA Confederations Cup.

During the opening ceremony, one of the tableaux depicted a ship – symbolising the voyages of the Portuguese explorers – sailing through a sea that transformed into the flags of all competing countries. In the closing ceremony, Portuguese-Canadian singer Nelly Furtado performed her single and official tournament theme song, "Força".

Bid process

Portugal were announced as hosts for UEFA Euro 2004 on 12 October 1999, in Aachen, Germany, beating Spain and the joint bid of Austria and Hungary.

Summary
Group A opened with a shock as Greece, ranked outsiders from start, defeated the hosts 2–1. Giorgos Karagounis put the Greeks ahead after only seven minutes and Angelos Basinas made it 2–0 from the penalty spot on 51 minutes. A stoppage-time goal by Cristiano Ronaldo proved no more than a consolation. Greece then drew with Spain before losing to Russia in their last group stage game. Portugal recovered from their opening defeat by defeating Russia 2–0, who had their keeper Sergei Ovchinnikov sent off. Nuno Gomes scored the winning goal against Spain, which ensured Portugal finished top of Group A. Greece advanced to the quarter-finals as runners-up, ahead of Spain on goals scored.

France, the holders, scored twice in stoppage time to go from 1–0 down to beat England 2–1. Zinedine Zidane scored both goals; the second from the penalty spot. England's other two games were memorable for the performances of their young star Wayne Rooney. Only 18 at the time, Rooney's goal-scoring ability proved instrumental in victories over Switzerland (3–0) and Croatia (4–2). France and England qualified from the group as winners and runners-up respectively.

Group C featured a three-way tie between Sweden, Denmark and Italy. All matches between the three sides had ended in draws and all three had beaten Bulgaria. Italy were ultimately eliminated on the number of goals scored after Sweden and Denmark drew 2–2 and qualified as group winners and runners-up. The Italians accused Sweden and Denmark of fixing their match, as both sides knew that a 2–2 result would advance them both over Italy, but UEFA dismissed the complaint.

The Czech Republic won Group D as the only team to win all three of their group matches. They defeated Latvia 2–1, the Netherlands 3–2, and Germany 2–1. It was another disappointing European campaign for the Germans, who failed to advance from the group stage for the second consecutive time. The Netherlands claimed a quarter-final berth as runners-up.

In the first quarter-final between England and Portugal, the English opened the score after only two minutes through Michael Owen. Portugal's constant attacking pressure from then on resulted in Hélder Postiga's 83rd-minute equaliser. In the dying minutes, Owen hit the Portuguese crossbar and Sol Campbell headed in the rebound, but the goal was ruled out by referee Urs Meier for a foul on the Portuguese goalkeeper Ricardo. The sides exchanged goals in extra-time, sending the match to a penalty shoot-out. Portugal won 6–5, as Ricardo saved from Darius Vassell and then scored the winning goal himself.

The Greeks, meanwhile, continued to stun everybody. Firm defensive play and an Angelos Charisteas goal on 65 minutes helped Greece defeat France 1–0 and progress to the semi-finals. This victory made Greece the first team to defeat both the holders and the hosts in the same tournament. Sweden and the Netherlands played out an exciting but goalless encounter, even after a dramatic period of extra-time in which Freddie Ljungberg hit the inside of the Dutch goalpost. The Dutch progressed after winning the penalty shoot-out 5–4, their first victory on penalties in a major tournament. The last quarter-final match saw the Czechs dispatch Denmark, as a two-goal effort from Milan Baroš helped seal a 3–0 win.

Portugal and the Netherlands faced each other in the first semi-final. Cristiano Ronaldo put the hosts in the lead from a corner kick midway through the first half, and just before the hour mark Maniche made it 2–0 with a spectacular goal from the corner of the penalty area. An own goal from Jorge Andrade gave the Netherlands a glimmer of hope. The game ended 2–1 to Portugal and the hosts, after their opening day failure, were through to the final of the European Championship for the first time. The Czech Republic looked likely candidates to face the hosts in the final. They were favourites to take the trophy, having won all four of their games. However, they would have to see off the upstart Greeks to do so. The Czechs had several chances, including a shot from Tomáš Rosický that struck the bar. The game remained goalless until the dying moments of the first half of extra time, when Traianos Dellas headed home the winner, the first and only silver goal in a European Championship.

The final was a repeat of the opening game of the tournament and Portugal were hoping to avenge their defeat. Portugal attacked and dominated possession but once again, sturdy defending and goalkeeping from Greece kept the hosts off the scoreboard. Just before the hour mark, Greece earned a corner kick from which Angelos Charisteas scored. Portugal continued to press after the goal but even with five minutes of stoppage time, they could not find an equaliser. Greece won the match 1–0 and were crowned European champions, a title that they were given a 150–1 chance of winning before the tournament. All of Greece's wins in the knockout stage came in an identical manner: a 1–0 win, with the goal being a header off a cross from the right wing. Portugal became the first host nation to lose in a European Championship final.

Qualification

The draw for the qualifying round was held on 25 January 2002 at the Europarque Congress Centre, in Santa Maria da Feira, Portugal. Fifty teams were divided into ten groups of five and each team played two matches against all its opponents, on a home-and-away basis. Qualification matches took place from September 2002 to November 2003. The first-placed teams from each group qualified automatically to the final tournament, whereas the ten runners-up took part in a two-legged play-off to select the remaining five teams that would join the host nation in the final tournament.

Qualified teams
Ten of the sixteen finalists participated in the previous tournament in 2000. Latvia made its first appearance in a major football competition, while Greece returned to the European Championship finals after a 24-year absence. Bulgaria, Croatia, Russia and Switzerland also took part in their second tournament finals since their debut in 1996.

As of 2022, this was the last time that Bulgaria qualified for the European Championship finals, the only time that Latvia qualified, as well as the last time that Poland failed to qualify.

Final draw
 The group stage draw took place on 30 November 2003 at the Pavilhão Atlântico in Lisbon, Portugal, and was televised live: Euro 2004 Draw on BBC Sport.

The 16 qualified finalists were drawn from four seeded pots into four groups. The pot allocations were based on the 2003-edition of the UEFA national team coefficient ranking, which measured performance of teams in the 2002 FIFA World Cup qualifying and UEFA Euro 2004 qualifying. The coefficient was calculated by dividing the number of all points scored (three points for a win, one for a draw) by the number of all matches played. Results from the final tournaments, play-off matches and friendly games were all ignored. As host country, Portugal were automatically placed in position A1, and would hereby play the opening match of the final tournament. The remaining 15 teams were split into four pots, with title-holders France seeded alongside Sweden and the Czech Republic in the first pot.

The Pot 1 teams were assigned to the first positions of their groups. For the purpose of determining the exact match schedules in each group, the 2nd/3rd/4th group positions were drawn separately for all other teams drawn from pot 2-4. The draw started by using pot 4 to draw one team to each of the four groups in alphabetic order from A to D. This same procedure was followed for pot 3 and pot 2. Finally the three remaining teams from pot 1 were drawn in alphabetic order into group B, C and D.

The draw resulted in the following groups:

Venues
The final tournament was played in ten venues located in eight different cities. Lisbon and Porto, the two biggest cities, had two venues each, while Aveiro, Braga, Coimbra, Faro-Loulé, Guimarães and Leiria had one venue. In order to meet UEFA's requirements on venue capacity and infrastructure, seven new stadiums were built – Estádio Municipal de Aveiro (Aveiro), Estádio Municipal de Braga (Braga), Estádio Algarve (Faro-Loulé), Estádio Dr. Magalhães Pessoa (Leiria), Estádio da Luz (Lisbon), Estádio José Alvalade (Lisbon), and Estádio do Dragão (Porto) – and three underwent renovation works – Estádio Cidade de Coimbra (Coimbra), Estádio D. Afonso Henriques (Guimarães), and Estádio do Bessa (Porto). The Estádio da Luz was the largest stadium with a tournament capacity of 65,647 seats, and served as the venue for the final. The opening ceremony and match took place at the Estádio do Dragão.

This was the first European Championship where matches took place in more than eight venues since the tournament was expanded to 16 teams in 1996.

The table below lists stadium capacity for the final tournament, which may not correspond to their effective maximum capacity.

Ticketing
A total of 1.2 million tickets were available for the 31 matches of the final tournament, of which 77% were to be sold to the general public, and the remainder reserved for sponsors and partners (13%), media (5%), and corporate hospitality (5%). Public sales for an initial batch of 450,000 tickets (38%) were launched on 28 April 2003, in a ceremony in Lisbon which gathered former European football stars Eusébio and Ruud Gullit. Ticket prices were divided in three categories, ranging from €35 (group matches) to €270 (final).

In a first phase lasting until 16 June 2003, supporters could apply for tickets via UEFA's tournament website or through forms available at the Portuguese Football Federation and match venues. Applicants could request a maximum of four tickets per match but were limited to one match per day. In parallel to individual match tickets, UEFA created a new category of tickets called "Follow My Team", which allowed supporters to see all the matches of their favourite team (group stage and, if qualified, knockout stage matches). If there were oversubscribed matches by the end of the first phase of sales, a match-specific draw would take place to select the successful applicants.

Between 1 August and 24 November 2003, available tickets were placed again on sale in a first-come, first-served basis. After the draw for the group stage on 30 November, a third phase of public sales began on 9 December, which included a second batch of tickets (39%) that could be bought until March 2004 through the national associations of the finalist teams. Every national association was awarded 20% of the venue capacity for each of their team's matches. From 1 to 30 April 2004, surplus tickets from UEFA or national associations were made available to the public for the last time. Ticket distribution began in May, after sales were officially closed.

Team base camps
Each team was provided a base camp for residence and daily training between tournament matches. An initial list of 25 bases approved by the Portuguese Football Federation, following a selection process started in November 2001, was announced by the organisation on 5 February 2003.

Squads

Each national team had to submit a squad of 23 players, three of whom must be goalkeepers, at least ten days before the opening match of the tournament. If a player became injured or ill severely enough to prevent his participation in the tournament before his team's first match, he would be replaced by another player.

Match officials
On 4 December 2003, UEFA revealed the twelve referees and four fourth officials. Each refereeing team was composed by one main referee and two assistant referees from the same country. In April 2004, the UEFA Referees Committee replaced Russian assistant referee Gennady Krasyuk with Yuri Dupanov of Belarus. The switch was made after Krasyuk incorrectly disallowed a second goal from Paul Scholes for offside in the Champions League round of 16 second leg between Manchester United and Porto.

Group stage

UEFA announced the match schedule for the final tournament on 10 March 2003, in Porto, Portugal. In a change from the previous tournament schedule, where two quarter-final matches were played per day, over two days, the quarter-finals at the Euro 2004 were to be played over four consecutive days, with one match per day.

All times are local, WEST (UTC+1).

Tiebreakers
If two or more teams were equal on points on completion of the group matches, the following tie-breaking criteria were applied:
 Higher number of points obtained in the matches played between the teams in question;
 Superior goal difference resulting from the matches played between the teams in question;
 Higher number of goals scored in the matches played between the teams in question;
 Superior goal difference in all group matches;
 Higher number of goals scored in all group matches;
 If on the last round of the group stage, two teams are facing each other and each has the same number of points, as well as the same number of goals scored and conceded, and the score finishes level in their match, their ranking is determined by a penalty shoot-out. (This criterion is not used if more than two teams have the same number of points.);
 Higher coefficient derived from 2002 FIFA World Cup qualifying and UEFA Euro 2004 qualifying (points obtained divided by number of matches played);
 Fair play conduct of the team in the final tournament;
 Drawing of lots.

Euro 2004 marked the introduction of the penalty shoot-out as a tiebreaker between two teams in the group stage, although no match required the use of this procedure. The same procedure was used in future European Championship tournaments.

Group A

Group B

Group C

Group D

Knockout stage

The knockout stage was a single-elimination tournament involving the eight teams that advanced from the group stage. There were three rounds of matches, with each round eliminating half of the teams entering that round, culminating in the final to decide the champions. Any game in the knockout stage that was not decided by the end of the regular 90 minutes was followed by up to 30 minutes of extra time (two 15-minute halves).

For the first time in an international football tournament, the silver goal system was applied, whereby the team that led the game at the half-time break during the extra time period would be declared the winner. If the scores were still level after the initial 15 minutes of extra time, play would continue for a further 15 minutes. If the teams could still not be separated after the extra time, there would be a penalty shoot-out (at least five penalties each) to determine which team progressed to the next round. The silver goal replaced the golden goal from the previous two championships and was used in the semi final between Greece and the Czech Republic.

As with every tournament since UEFA Euro 1984, there was no third place play-off.

All times are local, WEST (UTC+1).

Bracket

Quarter-finals

Semi-finals

Final

Statistics

Goalscorers

Awards
UEFA Team of the Tournament
The UEFA Technical Team was charged with naming a squad composed of the 23 best players over the course of the tournament. The group of eight analysts watched every game at the tournament before making their decision after the final. Five players from the winning Greek team were named to the team of the tournament. Michael Ballack and Gianluca Zambrotta were the only players to be included whose teams were knocked out in the group stage.

Golden Boot
The Golden Boot was awarded to Milan Baroš, who scored all five of his goals in three group stage matches and in the quarter-finals against Denmark.
 Milan Baroš (5 goals)

UEFA Player of the Tournament
 Theodoros Zagorakis

Prize money
Overall, CHF200 million was awarded to the 16 teams, a boost from the CHF120 million in the previous event. Below is a complete list of the allocations:

Prize for participating: CHF7.5 million

Extra payment based on teams performance:
Winner: CHF10 million
Runner-up: CHF6 million
Semi-finals: CHF4 million
Quarter-finals: CHF3 million
Group stage (per match):
Win: CHF1 million
Draw: CHF500,000

Discipline
If a player was shown a red card – whether as a result of two bookable offences or a straight red – he would become suspended from playing in his team's next match. A player would also become suspended for one match for picking up two yellow cards in separate matches. However, any yellow cards accumulated would be cancelled once a team was eliminated from the tournament or reached the semi-finals. In extreme cases of ill-discipline, UEFA could choose to have a disciplinary panel examine the incident in order to determine whether or not further suspension would be required.

The following players were suspended for one or more games as a result of red cards or yellow card accumulation:

Marketing

Logo, mascot and official song

The official tournament logo was created by Euro RSCG Wnek Gosper agency and unveiled on 13 May 2002 at a ceremony held in Lisbon's Belém Cultural Center. It represents a football in the centre of a heart, surrounded by seven green dots. The football – displaying typical Portuguese folk artistic motifs on its panels – and the heart – shaped in the traditional style of the filigree art from Viana do Castelo – conveyed the football passion of the host country. The seven dots represent significant Portuguese elements and achievements, such as the number of castles in the national coat of arms or the conquest of the seven seas during the Age of Discoveries. The logo's colour palette was based on the Portuguese flag and its warm tones recall the light and sun associated with the Portuguese landscape and climate. The competition slogan used was "Vive O 2004!".

The official mascot was a boy named Kinas – derived from quinas, one of the symbols of the Portuguese coat of arms – who wore a football kit with the Portuguese colours (red shirt and green shorts) and was constantly playing with a football. He possessed the knowledge and talent of generations of highly gifted football players, and embodied the energy and passion of football. Created by Warner Bros., Kinas was officially unveiled on 29 March 2003 at the Casa de Serralves, in Porto, Portugal.

The official song, called "Força", was written and performed by Portuguese-Canadian singer Nelly Furtado. The song was taken from her second studio album, Folklore, and released as its third single, soon after the start of the tournament. Furtado was selected to sing the official song of the tournament, because of her familial connection to the host country (her parents are both Portuguese from the Azores). She wrote "Força" with "the passion the Portuguese people have for football" in mind. The song was played at every match, and performed live by Furtado at the closing ceremony prior to the final.

Match ball

The official match ball was presented during the final draw ceremony on 30 November 2003 in Lisbon. It was produced by Adidas and named Adidas Roteiro, after the logbook used by Portuguese maritime explorers such as Vasco da Gama. Roteiro was the first official tournament football to employ the new thermal-bonding technique in its production, which resulted in a seamless surface and a more homogeneous design. Portuguese Football Federation president Gilberto Madaíl praised the ball, stating: "Adidas has delivered a stunning, modern and state-of the-art Portuguese football. This is very much how we envisage the UEFA Euro 2004 event to be". Roteiro was also used at the 2004 AFC Asian Cup, and during the mid-season of the 2004–05 German Bundesliga.

The new ball received mixed reactions from players and technical staffs. England midfielder David Beckham, who was asked by Adidas to test it, was pleased with Roteiro's performance, particularly in free-kicks. France midfielder Zinedine Zidane believed the ball would "improve the game". Several Spanish players, however, regarded it as "horrible, difficult to control and to pass", with Real Madrid footballer Iván Helguera describing it as a "beach ball". Notable players of the Italy national team, such as Francesco Totti, Andrea Pirlo and goalkeeper Gianluigi Buffon also voiced criticisms.

Trophy tour
During the two months ahead of the tournament, the Henri Delaunay Trophy travelled across Portugal to promote the European Championship finals in the host country. The tour began on 8 April 2004 at the Praça do Comércio in Lisbon, where the launching ceremony took place with the presence of Portuguese football legend and tournament ambassador Eusébio. A total of twenty towns and cities were visited by the trophy tour caravan, including the ten that would host matches.

Merchandise and memorabilia
In November 2002, UEFA appointed Warner Bros. Consumer Products (WBCP) as the tournament's exclusive worldwide licensing agent. As the global licensing rights owner, WBCP was responsible for negotiating product licence contracts with third parties on the behalf of UEFA and delineate product sales strategies across the host country. Other tasks included setting up and managing marketing plans, product distribution and prices, and prevent illegal use of trademarks and product sales. Over 2,000 merchandise items were developed by the 28 licencees chosen by WBCP, and were distributed not only within Portugal but also in major European and Asian markets.

To celebrate Portugal's hosting of the Euro 2004 finals, commemorative coin and stamp collections were issued by the Imprensa Nacional-Casa da Moeda, the Portuguese national mint and printing house, and CTT, the national postal service.

Sponsorship
UEFA distinguishes between global sponsors and national sponsors. Global Euro sponsors can come from any country and have together exclusive worldwide sponsorship rights for a UEFA European Football Championship. National sponsors come from the host country and do only have sponsorship rights within that country. Eight sponsors were announced by UEFA in December 2002.

Broadcasting

Nineteen cameras were used in each of the ten venues to broadcast the live matches, with three additional cameras in the opening and knockout stage matches.

See also
Vive O 2004!, the official album for UEFA Euro 2004
UEFA Euro 2004, the official video game for UEFA Euro 2004

References

External links

 UEFA Euro 2004 at UEFA.com
 
 Official Technical Report

 
2004
2003–04 in European football
2003–04 in Portuguese football
2004
June 2004 sports events in Europe
July 2004 sports events in Europe